Poudre Park is an unincorporated community in Larimer County, Colorado. It is located near Poudre Canyon and is west of Fort Collins.

References

Unincorporated communities in Colorado